Stephen Zápolya (died on 23 December 1499), was Palatine of the Kingdom of Hungary between 1492 and 1499.

He married Polish princess Hedwig of Cieszyn on 11 August 1483 (his second marriage), by whom he had four children:
 János Zápolya (2 June 1487 – 22 July 1540), later King of Hungary;
 George Zápolya (ca. 1494 – 29 August 1526), killed in action at Mohács;
 Barbara Zápolya (1495 – 2 October 1515), queen consort of Poland after her marriage to Sigismund I the Old;
 Magdalena Zápolya (b. ca. 1499 – 1499), died young.

He was buried in the Zápolya family vault on the Szepes chapter house.

Notes

Sources

 
 
 
 
 
 
 
 

|-

1499 deaths
Stephen
Palatines of Hungary
Year of birth unknown